The 1896 Invercargill mayoral election was held on 25 November 1896 as part of that year's local elections.

Councillor Josiah Hanan defeated fellow councillor, John Stead.

Results
The following table gives the election results:

References

1896 elections in New Zealand
Mayoral elections in Invercargill